Alan Peter Griffin (born 23 February 1960) is a former Australian politician of the Australian Labor Party. He was a member of the Australian House of Representatives, representing the Division of Corinella between 1993 and March 1996, and the Division of Bruce, from March 1996 until May 2016.

Background and early career
Griffin was born in Melbourne, Victoria, and was educated at the Australian National University. He was a public servant, union organiser and electorate secretary before entering politics. Griffin was ministerial adviser to the Victorian Minister for Community Services, Kay Setches, 1990–91 and to Simon Crean, then a federal minister, 1991–93. He was also a member of the Springvale City Council, 1991–93.

Political career
Griffin was first elected to Parliament at the 1993 federal election, unseating the Liberal incumbent in Corinella, Russell Broadbent. He became a backbench supporter of Prime Minister Paul Keating's government. Corinella was abolished for the 1996 election, and Griffin followed most of his constituents into Bruce.

That seat had been in Liberal hands since its creation in 1955. However, it had been significantly altered by the latest redistribution, which gave Labor a slim majority. Griffin defeated Liberal incumbent Julian Beale by only 1195 votes, making him one of the few bright spots in Labor's severe defeat that year.

Griffin was elected to the Opposition Shadow Ministry in October 1998. He was Shadow Minister for Consumer Affairs and Shadow Minister Assisting the Shadow Minister for Health from 2003 to 2005. In June 2005, he was appointed Shadow Minister for Veterans' Affairs and Shadow Special Minister of State.

After Labor won government back in the 2007 federal election, new Prime Minister Kevin Rudd appointed Griffin Minister for Veterans' Affairs in the ministry. On 1 April 2010, he gained the portfolio of Minister for Defence Personnel. He retained these portfolios in Julia Gillard's first ministry but chose not to continue in the Second Gillard Ministry, which was sworn in on 14 September 2010 following the 2010 election.

On 10 February 2015, he announced he would not contest the next election, due in 2016. In March 2015, former City of Port Phillip Mayor Julian Hill was preselected unopposed to contest Bruce for the Labor Party.

See also
 First Rudd Ministry
 First Gillard Ministry

References

 Alan Griffin's website

External links
 

1960 births
Living people
Politicians from Melbourne
Australian Labor Party members of the Parliament of Australia
Members of the Australian House of Representatives
Members of the Australian House of Representatives for Bruce
Members of the Australian House of Representatives for Corinella
Labor Left politicians
21st-century Australian politicians
20th-century Australian politicians
Government ministers of Australia
Australian National University alumni